Diseases, both real and fictional, play a significant role in fiction, with certain diseases like Huntington's disease and tuberculosis appearing in many books and films. Pandemic plagues threatening all human life, such as The Andromeda Strain, are among the many fictional diseases described in literature and film.

Real diseases

Genuine plagues have formed the central elements of books from Giovanni Boccaccio's c. 1353 The Decameron onwards. Boccaccio tells the tales of ten people of Florence who escape from the Black Death in their city. The book inspired Geoffrey Chaucer's 14th-century Canterbury Tales, which similarly tells the stories of people on pilgrimage in a time of plague. Ingmar Bergman's 1957 film The Seventh Seal is set in Denmark during the Black Death, and features a game of chess with Death personified as a monk-like figure.

Tuberculosis was a common disease in the 19th century, and it appeared in several major works of Russian literature. Fyodor Dostoevsky used the theme of the consumptive nihilist repeatedly, with Katerina Ivanovna in Crime and Punishment; Kirillov in The Possessed, and both Ippolit and Marie in The Idiot. Turgenev did the same with Bazarov in Fathers and Sons. In English literature of the Victorian era, major tuberculosis novels include Charles Dickens's 1848 Dombey and Son, Elizabeth Gaskell's 1855 North and South, and Mrs. Humphry Ward's 1900 Eleanor.

Albert Camus's 1947 The Plague, probably based on cholera in 19th-century France, was seen both as fable about the need for people to help each other in the meaningless world seen by existentialism, and as alluding to the German invasion of France, fresh in Camus's mind.

Huntington's disease appears in many novels, such as  Ian McEwan's 2005 Saturday. It was criticised as prejudiced in the medical journal The Lancet for its negative portrayal of the protagonist with the disease.

Fictional diseases

Diseases, especially if infectious, have long been popular themes and plot devices in fiction. Daniel Defoe's pioneering 1722 A Journal of the Plague Year is a fictional diary of a man's life during the plague year of 1665 in England. Mary Shelley's 1826 The Last Man created the genre of "post-apocalyptic pandemic thriller" with her story of a plague that is spreading across Europe towards her protagonists in Britain. Edgar Allan Poe's 1842 "The Masque of the Red Death" is a gothic tale of a plague, perhaps symbolising the hubris of the wealthy, and their nemesis. 

More recently, Michael Crichton's 1969 The Andromeda Strain is a science fiction thriller about a world-threatening microbe that a military satellite brings down to Earth and wipes out a town in Arizona. White-coated scientists do their best to contain the outbreak. The 1995 12 Monkeys is another post-apocalyptic thriller.

See also 

 Biology in fiction
 Medical fiction
 Parasites in fiction

References

Further reading
 Tirard, Nestor (1886) Disease in Fiction. Its place in current literature.
 Rothfield, Lawrence (1992) Vital Signs Medical Realism in Nineteenth-Century Fiction.
 Krémer, René (2003) "Les malades imaginés: Diseases in fiction". Acta Cardiologica.
 Westfahl, Gary; Slusser, George (2002) No Cure for the Future: Disease and Medicine in Science Fiction and Fantasy. 
 Christensen, Allen Conrad (2005) Nineteenth-Century Narratives of Contagion. 
 VanderMeer, Jeff; Roberts, Mark (1915) The Thackery T. Lambshead Pocket Guide to Eccentric & Discredited Diseases. 

 
Biology and culture
Medicine and health in fiction
Dark fantasy